Levkas Man is a thriller novel by British author Hammond Innes published in 1971. It tells the story of a doctor who goes to the Greek island of Lefkada with his adopted son to prove a theory about prehistoric man.

Television adaptation

Levkas Man was adapted into a six-episode mini television series by the Australian Broadcasting Corporation (ABC), which aired from 18 March until 22 April 1981. It was a joint Australian–British–West German production, and was shot on location in Greece.

Cast

 Robert Coleby - Paul Gerrard
 Marius Goring - Dr. Pieter Gerrard
 Ann Michelle - Nicola
 T.P. McKenna - Holroyd
 Kenneth Cope - Bert
 Takis Emmanuel - Kotiades
 Ferdy Mayne - Borg

References

External links
Levkas Man at IMDb
Levkas Man at AustLit

1971 British novels
Novels by Hammond Innes
British thriller novels
1980s Australian television miniseries
1981 Australian television series debuts
1981 Australian television series endings
1981 television films
1981 films
English-language television shows
William Collins, Sons books